Federal buildings in the United States house offices of the United States government that provide services to state and city level population centers. These federal buildings are often literally named Federal Building, with this moniker displayed on the property; they may share real estate with  federal courthouses.

There are design issues specific to federal buildings, relating to their multipurpose functions and concerns related to the fact of their association with the government.  For example, as symbols of the government, they may potentially be focus of protests or threats, so there are security issues.  Also environmental impacts and environmentally sound design may be more important.

A committee set up by President John F. Kennedy in 1962 issued "Guiding Principles for Federal Architecture".  Towards improving design of federal buildings in the United States, "the committee recommended architecture that would convey the 'dignity, enterprise, vigor, and stability of the American Government.' Designers and officials were encouraged to pay special attention to site selection and layout, including landscape development."

Some architects specialize in federal building designs.

History
The first U.S. Federal building authorized by the U.S. Congress in 1807, with an appropriation of $20,000 to build, in New Orleans, a post office, courthouse, or custom house.

Historically, the authorization and construction of the first federally-funded building in a small town often has been a major event.  Sometimes these were simply a post office or a courthouse;  often they were combination buildings.

The Treasury Department of the U.S. established a Department of Construction office in 1852.  From 1864 on the Office of the Supervising Architect handled design of federal buildings.

William Gibbs McAdoo, the Secretary of the Treasury from 1913 to 1918, and the Supervising Architect at the time, James A. Wetmore promoted standardization of government building design. They instituted the policy that buildings were to be designed with "scale, materials and finishes" that directly reflected their "location, prominence and income". This push to standardization of public building design was in conflict with the Tarsney Act, which permitted private architects to design federal buildings after being selected in a competition under the supervision of the Supervising Architect. The act, under which several prior buildings were designed, was repealed in 1913 as it was felt that designing building with government architects would most efficiently cause the desired standardization.

Buildings were to be designed with specific criteria, A "Class A" building was one which was on a major street of a major city, surrounding by expensive building and expected to generate at least $800,000 in revenue. These buildings would have marble or granite exteriors, marble interiors, ornamental bronze, and other similar fixtures.

A small post office with revenue of under $15,000 would be made of brick, with standard wood windows and doors and would appear "ordinary". Critics felt the system would make public buildings too plain.

The growth of cities and government functions has led to the need for large multipurpose highrise federal buildings.  An example is the 32-story $120 million construction in Cleveland of the Anthony J. Celebrezze Federal Building.

In the United States, multipurpose federal buildings are generally managed by the U.S. General Services Administration.  The GSA recognized its top 20 federal buildings in 2014.

List of federal buildings in the United States
Notable buildings in the United States that have been termed "federal building" include:

Alabama
 Federal Building and U.S. Courthouse (Dothan, Alabama), listed on the National Register of Historic Places (NRHP)

Alaska
 Federal Building (Fairbanks, Alaska), NRHP-listed in Fairbanks North Star Borough
 Hurff Ackerman Saunders Federal Building and Robert Boochever US Courthouse, Juneau, Alaska
 Ketchikan Federal Building, Ketchikan, Alaska, NRHP-listed
 Old Federal Building (Anchorage, Alaska), NRHP-listed

Arkansas
Federal Building (Little Rock, Arkansas) (1961)

California
 300 North Los Angeles Street Federal Building
 Edward R. Roybal Federal Building, Los Angeles, California
 James C. Corman Federal Building, Los Angeles, California
 Main Post Office and Federal Building (Oakland, California), NRHP-listed in Alameda County
 Ronald V. Dellums Federal Building, Oakland, California
 San Francisco Federal Building, San Francisco, California
 U.S. Post Office, Courthouse and Federal Building (Sacramento, California), NRHP-listed
 U.S. Post Office (Stockton, California), also known as the Federal Building
 Wilshire Federal Building,  Los Angeles, California

Colorado
 Byron White United States Courthouse, Denver, Colorado, formerly known and NRHP-listed as "U.S. Post Office and Federal Building"
 Federal Building (Colorado Springs, Colorado), a former Ent Air Force Base computer facility
 Pueblo Federal Building, Pueblo, Colorado, NRHP-listed
 United States Post Office and Federal Courthouse-Colorado Springs Main, NRHP-listed
 US Post Office and Federal Building-Canon City Main, Canon City, Colorado, NRHP-listed in Fremont County
 US Post Office and Federal Building-Delta Main, Delta, Colorado, NRHP-listed in Delta County
 US Post Office and Federal Building-Monte Vista Main, Monte Vista, Colorado, NRHP-listed in Rio Grande County
 US Post Office, Federal Building, and Federal Courthouse-Sterling Main, Sterling, Colorado, NRHP-listed in Logan County

Connecticut
 William R. Cotter Federal Building, Hartford, Connecticut, NRHP-listed

Florida
 U.S. Post Office-Federal Building (Sarasota, Florida), NRHP-listed
 U.S. Courthouse Building and Downtown Postal Station (Tampa, Florida), also known and NRHP-listed as "Federal Building, U.S. Courthouse, Downtown Postal Station"

Georgia
 Federal Building and Courthouse (Gainesville, Georgia), NRHP-listed
 Old U.S. Post Office and Federal Building (Macon, Georgia), NRHP-listed
 Tomochichi Federal Building and United States Courthouse, Savannah, Georgia, NRHP-listed

Hawaii
 Prince Kūhiō Federal Building, Honolulu, Hawaii

Idaho
 Coeur d'Alene Federal Building, Coeur d'Alene, Idaho, NRHP-listed in Kootenai County
 Pocatello Federal Building, Pocatello, Idaho, NRHP-listed in Bannock County
 Sandpoint Federal Building, Sandpoint, Idaho, NRHP-listed in Bonner County

Illinois
 Chicago Federal Building, Chicago, Illinois
 Everett M. Dirksen U.S. Courthouse, also known as "Dirksen Federal Building" or the "Chicago Federal Center", Chicago, Illinois
 Kluczynski Federal Building, Chicago, Illinois
 Pekin Federal Building, Pekin, Illinois, NRHP-listed

Indiana
 Birch Bayh Federal Building and United States Courthouse, a courthouse of the United States District Court for the Southern District of Indiana, also known as Federal Building
 Minton-Capehart Federal Building, Indianapolis, Indiana
 Terre Haute Post Office and Federal Building, Terre Haute, Indiana, NRHP-listed

Iowa
 Federal Building and United States Courthouse (Sioux City, Iowa), NRHP-listed

Kansas
 Federal Building-US Post Office (Independence, Kansas), NRHP-listed in Montgomery County
 US Post Office and Federal Building-Salina, Salina, Kansas, NRHP-listed in Saline County
 United States Post Office and Federal Building (Wichita, Kansas), NRHP-listed

Kentucky
 Federal Building-Courthouse (London, Kentucky), NRHP-listed
 Federal Building and US Post Office-Owensboro, Owensboro, Kentucky, NRHP-listed in Daviess County

Louisiana
 Federal Building (Ruston, Louisiana), NRHP-listed in Lincoln Parish
 Old Federal Building (Opelousas, Louisiana), NRHP-listed in St. Landry Parish

Michigan
 Federal Building (Lansing, Michigan), NRHP-listed in Ingham County
 Federal Building (Port Huron, Michigan), NRHP-listed
 Old Federal Building (Sault Ste. Marie), NRHP-listed

Missouri
 United States Post Office (Hannibal, Missouri), also known and NRHP-listed as "Federal Building"

Montana
 Federal Building (Kalispell, Montana), NRHP-listed in Flathead County
 Lewistown Federal Building & Post Office (1931), Lewistown, Montana, NRHP-listed in Fergus County

Nebraska
North Platte U.S. Post Office and Federal Building, NRHP-listed
 Federal Office Building (Omaha, Nebraska), NRHP-listed

Nevada
 Federal Building and Post Office (Fallon, Nevada), NRHP-listed

New Jersey
 Federal Building and Courthouse (Camden, New Jersey), NRHP-listed in Camden County

New Mexico
 Federal Building and United States Courthouse (Albuquerque, New Mexico), NRHP-listed
 Federal Building (Santa Fe, New Mexico), NRHP-listed

New York
 Charles L. Brieant, Jr. Federal Building and Courthouse, White Plains, New York
 Federal Building and Post Office (New York, New York), NRHP-listed in New York
 Federal Building (Rochester, New York), NRHP-listed
 Jacob K. Javits Federal Building, New York, New York

North Carolina
 Alton Lennon Federal Building and Courthouse, Wilmington, North Carolina, NRHP-listed
 Charles R. Jonas Federal Building, Charlotte, North Carolina, NRHP-listed
 Federal Building (Raleigh, North Carolina), NRHP-listed
 Federal Building (Wilkesboro, North Carolina), NRHP-listed
 U. S. Post Office and Federal Building (Rockingham, North Carolina), NRHP-listed

Ohio
 Akron Post Office and Federal Building, Akron, Ohio, NRHP-listed
 Ralph Regula Federal Building and US Courthouse, Canton, OH
 Anthony J. Celebrezze Federal Building, Cleveland, Ohio
 John W. Bricker Federal Building, Columbus, Ohio
 Donald J. Pease Federal Building, Medina, Ohio, NRHP-listed in Medina County
 Federal Building (Youngstown, Ohio), NRHP-listed in Mahoning County
 Old Federal Building and Post Office (Cleveland, Ohio), NRHP-listed
 Old Post Office and Federal Building (Dayton, Ohio), NRHP-listed in Montgomery County
 US Post Office and Federal Building-Zanesville, Zanesville, Ohio, NRHP-listed

Oklahoma
 Federal Building and US Courthouse (Lawton, Oklahoma), NRHP-listed in Comanche County
 Alfred P. Murrah Federal Building, Oklahoma City, Oklahoma, former building destroyed in 1995 bombing
 Carl Albert Federal Building, McAlester, Oklahoma, NRHP-listed

Oregon
 511 Federal Building, Portland, Oregon, NRHP-listed
Edith Green – Wendell Wyatt Federal Building, Portland, Oregon, 18 stories
 U.S. Post Office and Federal Building (La Grande, Oregon), NRHP-listed in Union County

Rhode Island
 Federal Building (Providence, Rhode Island), NRHP-listed

South Carolina
 C.F. Haynsworth Federal Building and United States Courthouse, Greenville, South Carolina, NRHP-listed
 Strom Thurmond Federal Building and United States Courthouse, Columbia, South Carolina, NRHP-listed

South Dakota
 Federal Building and U.S. Courthouse (Sioux Falls, South Dakota), NRHP-listed

Tennessee
 Clarksville Federal Building, Clarksville, Tennessee, NRHP-listed in Montgomery County
 Federal Building (Maryville, Tennessee), NRHP-listed in Blount County
 Joel W. Solomon Federal Building and United States Courthouse, Chattanooga, Tennessee, NRHP-listed

Texas
 Federal Building (Abilene, Texas), NRHP-listed in Taylor County
 Hipolito F. Garcia Federal Building and United States Courthouse, NRHP-listed in Bexar County as "San Antonio US Post Office and Courthouse"
 J. J. Pickle Federal Building, Austin, Texas, NRHP-listed in Travis County
 Jack Brooks Federal Building, Beaumont, Texas, NRHP-listed
 Lubbock Post Office and Federal Building, Lubbock, Texas, NRHP-listed
 O. C. Fisher Federal Building, San Angelo, Texas, NRHP-listed in Tom Green County
 Old Federal Building and Post Office (Victoria, Texas), NRHP-listed in Victoria County
 Sam B. Hall, Jr. Federal Building and United States Courthouse, Marshall, Texas, NRHP-listed
 U.S. Post Office and Federal Building (Austin, Texas), NRHP-listed
 US Post Office and Federal Building (Port Arthur, Texas), NRHP-listed in Jefferson County
 US Post Office-Federal Building-Brenham, Brenham, Texas, NRHP-listed in Washington County
 Ward R. Burke U.S. Courthouse, Lufkin, Texas, also known and NRHP-listed in Angelina County as "Old Federal Building-Federal Courthouse"

Vermont
 Old Bennington Post Office, Bennington, Vermont, also known as "U.S. Federal Building", NRHP-listed

Virginia
 C. Bascom Slemp Federal Building, Big Stone Gap, Virginia, NRHP-listed as "United States Post Office and Courthouse"

Washington
 U.S. Post Office and Courthouse (Bellingham, Washington), also known as "Federal Building", built during 1912–13, NRHP-listed
 U.S. Post Office and Customshouse (Everett, Washington), also known as "Federal Building", NRHP-listed in Snohomish County
 U.S. Post Office – Downtown Tacoma, Tacoma, Washington, NRHP-listed in Pierce County
Federal Office Building (Seattle), a 1932 Art Deco building on the NRHP
Henry M. Jackson Federal Building, Seattle, a 37-story Federal skyscraper built in 1974
 Richland Federal building, a seven-story building built in 1975, with post office and courthouse

Washington, D.C.
 Robert C. Weaver Federal Building (1961), Washington, D.C., NRHP-listed

West Virginia
Elizabeth Kee Federal Building, Bluefield, West Virginia
Federal Building and U.S. Courthouse (Wheeling, West Virginia, 1907)
Robert C. Byrd Federal Building and U.S. Courthouse, Beckley, West Virginia
Sidney L. Christie Federal Building, Charleston, West Virginia
United States Courthouse and Federal Building (Parkersburg, West Virginia)

Wisconsin
 Federal Building (Milwaukee, Wisconsin), NRHP-listed
 United States Post Office and Courthouse (Eau Claire, Wisconsin), also known as "Federal Building and U.S. Courthouse", NRHP-listed

Wyoming
 Ewing T. Kerr Federal Building and U.S. Courthouse, Casper, Wyoming, NRHP-listed in Natrona County

See also 
 Federal Building and Post Office (disambiguation)
 List of United States post offices
 List of United States federal courthouses

References